Zhongyiyaodaxue is an interchange station on lines 2 and 10 of the Shenyang Metro. The line 2 station opened on 30 December 2011, and the line 10 station opened on 29 April 2020. The station serves China Medical University.

Station Layout

References 

Railway stations in China opened in 2011
Shenyang Metro stations